The 2008–09 season of the Hoofdklasse was competed in six leagues: three Saturday leagues, and three Sunday leagues.

Saturday A

Saturday B

Saturday C

Sunday A

Sunday B

Sunday C

Championship

Saturday championship

Sunday championship

Final

References

 soccerway.com
 www.knvb.nl

Vierde Divisie seasons
Neth
4